"The Father's House" is a song performed by American contemporary worship musician Cory Asbury, which was released as the lead single to Asbury's third studio album, To Love a Fool, on January 24, 2020. Asbury collaborated with Ethan Hulse and Benjamin Hastings of Hillsong United in writing the song, and the production of the single was handled by Ed Cash.

"The Father's House" was a commercial success, having reached No. 3 on the US Hot Christian Songs chart while becoming Asbury's second top ten on the chart. "The Father's House" received a nomination for the GMA Dove Award Song of the Year at the 2021 GMA Dove Awards.

Background
Cory Asbury announced on his social media that he would be releasing new music on January 24, 2020. On January 17, 2020, Asbury then announced that "The Father's House" would be released on January 24, availing the single for pre-save on Spotify.

On November 6, 2020, Asbury released the live version of "The Father's House" as part of his album,  To Love a Fool – A Rooftop Experience (2020).

Writing and development
Cory Asbury shared the story behind the song in an interview published on the Bethel Music website on January 23, 2020, saying: 

Asbury added that during his hiatus, Benjamin  Hastings had visited him at his home in Michigan and opined that the lyric was a verse, not a chorus, and from there on, began writing out the song.

Composition

Accolades

Commercial performance
"The Father's House" debuted at No. 16 on the US Hot Christian Songs chart dated February 8, 2020. Before its release, the song had spent five weeks on the Christian Airplay chart, having debuted at No. 45 on the issue dated January 11, 2020, and reaching No. 20 on the February 8 chart issue, indicating that the song received early radio airplay. In the song's eleventh week on Christian Airplay, the song reached No. 10, becoming his second top ten on the chart, after his 2018 hit single "Reckless Love". On the Hot Christian Songs chart dated March 28, 2020, "The Father's House" also became his second top ten, having peaked at No. 10.

Music videos
The acoustic music video of "The Father's House" performed by Cory Asbury was released on Apple Music on January 24, 2020, with the lyric video of the song being published on Bethel Music's YouTube channel on the same day. The acoustic music video was then released to YouTube by Bethel Music on January 31, 2020. Bethel Music then released a live music video of the song being performed by Asbury at Bethel Church via YouTube on March 13, 2020.

Track listing

Charts

Weekly charts

Year-end charts

Release history

References

External links
  on PraiseCharts

2020 singles
2020 songs
Cory Asbury songs
Songs written by Ethan Hulse